Caspar Riffel (January 19, 1807, Budesheim, Bingen, Germany – December 15, 1856) was a historian. He studied under Heinrich Klee at Mainz and Bonn and under Johann Adam Möhler at Tübingen. After his ordination to the priesthood (18 Dec., 1830) he was named assistant priest at Bingen. In 1835 he was appointed to a parish in Giessen, and to the chair of moral theology in the local theological faculty. His transfer to the professorship in Church history followed in 1837.

The publication of the first volume of his Church history in 1841 aroused a storm of indignation among Protestants, to whom his unflattering account of the Protestant Reformation was distasteful. The Hessian Government hastened to retire him (19 Nov., 1842). This measure caused intense indignation among the diocesan Catholic clergy, who denounced the Protestant atmosphere of the university. Riffel retired to Mainz, where in 1851 Bishop von Ketteler appointed him professor of Church history in his newly organized ecclesiastical seminary.

Publications
Geschichtliche Darstellung des Verhältnisses zwischen Kirche und Staat (Historical representation of the relationship between Church and State), Mainz, 1836; 
Predigten auf alle Sonn- und Festtage des Jahres, Mainz, 1839–40, 3rd ed., 1854; 
Christliche Kirchengeschichte der neuesten Zeit (Recent history of the Christian Church), Mainz, 1841–46; 
Die Aufhebung des Jesuitenordens (The Rise of the Jesuits), 3rd ed., Mainz, 1855.

References

Attribution
 Cites:
GOYAU, L'Allemagne religieuse: le Catholicisme (Religious Germany: Catholicism), II (Paris, 1905), 313.

1807 births
1856 deaths
19th-century German historians
19th-century German male writers
German male non-fiction writers